South East Lancashire was a county constituency of the House of Commons of the Parliament of the United Kingdom. It was represented by two Members of Parliament. The constituency was created by the Reform act of 1867 by the splitting of the South Lancashire constituency into South-West and South-East divisions.

The constituency was abolished by the Redistribution of Seats Act 1885, being divided into eight single member divisions of Eccles, Radcliffe-cum-Farnworth, Gorton, Heywood, Middleton, Prestwich, Stretford and Westhoughton.

Boundaries

This constituency comprised the Salford hundred of Lancashire except for those parts of the hundred lying in the Parliamentary boroughs of Ashton-under-Lyne, Bolton, Bury, Manchester, Rochdale, Salford and Stalybridge.

Members of Parliament

Constituency created (1868)

Elections

References

Sources

History of Salford
History of Lancashire
Politics of Lancashire
Parliamentary constituencies in North West England (historic)
Constituencies of the Parliament of the United Kingdom established in 1868
Constituencies of the Parliament of the United Kingdom disestablished in 1885
Politics of Salford